Kaneohe Ranch Management Limited manages the real estate owned by the family of Harold K.L. Castle and Alice H. Castle, and their non-profit charitable foundation, the Harold K.L. Castle Foundation founded in 1962. The real estate portfolio consists of land holdings on the windward side of Oahu, Hawaii, as well as other Oahu and mainland United States properties. Properties include commercial, retail, office, industrial and residential parcels.

History

Mid 19th century

During the mid-19th century, most of the land in the area belonged to Kalama, Queen Consort of Kamehameha III and later Queen Dowager of the Kingdom of Hawaii. She and Judge Charles Coffin Harris began a sugarcane plantation on the land, but after she died in 1870 and it failed in 1871, the land eventually passed to Harris's daughter, Nannie H. Rice, who leased  to J. P. Mendonca in 1894 to start Kaneohe Ranch.

Late 19th-early 20th century

Born in 1886, Harold Kainalu Long Castle was the descendant of prominent businessmen and missionaries in Oahu.  James Bicknell Castle, his father, served as a director of his father's company and as a partner of Alexander & Baldwin, another “Big Five” company. By the late 1890s the Castle family was accumulating much of the east side of the island.

In the early 20th century Kaneohe Ranch lands were used for growing pineapple, processing sugar and for cattle operations.  Harold K.L. Castle purchased Kailua in early 1917. The Kaneohe Ranch controlled nearly the entire Ko’olaupoko plain from the present Windward Community College through the present Windward Mall down to the piers at Heeia on Kaneohe Bay, all the way through Kailua to the Olomana Country Club. Its headquarters, the Kaneohe Ranch Building at Castle Junction, was added to the U.S. National Register of Historic Places in 1987.

Mid-to-late 20th century

Over the last half of the 20th century, Kaneohe Ranch transformed what was once natural wetlands into a suburban community. 

At the end of World War II, demand for affordable housing grew.  The idea to build houses on long-term leased land became popular due to their lower purchase cost.

As part of his development strategy, Castle donated land along Kailua Road to churches that would eventually attract congregations to migrate towards Kailua.  Further donations of land to schools, universities and hospitals enhanced the attractiveness of the community.

Donations of Kaneohe Ranch land
Castle High School
Castle Medical Center
Marine Corps Base Hawaii
Kawai Nui Marsh
Hawaii Loa College
Windward Community College

Community development
In the early 21st century, many commercial ground leases expired. Kaneohe Ranch initiated a community planning process in 2004 for redeveloping properties with expiring leases. 
In 2004 the first phase of construction in Kailua town center included a new  Longs Drugs store,  of retail frontage along Kailua Road, and a 427 stall, 3-story parking garage.

The second phase, completed in the summer of 2006, included a  Pier 1 Imports and the Kainalu Plaza and fountain.

The Kalapawai Café opened in 2007 with a similar look to the Kalapawai Market.

The third phase included  of retail space, a new location for First Hawaiian Bank, Hawaii's second Whole Foods Market, and additional parking.

References

External links
Kaneohe Ranch Management Limited
Harold K.L. Castle Foundation

Companies based in Hawaii
Real estate companies of the United States
Oahu
1894 establishments in the United States
1894 establishments in Hawaii
Ranches in Hawaii
Companies established in 1894